The 1991 Cincinnati Open, known by the corporate title of the Thriftway ATP Championships was a tennis tournament played on outdoor clay courts. It was the 90th edition of the tournament and was part of the ATP Super 9 of the 1991 ATP Tour It took place in Mason, Ohio, United States, from August 5 through August 11, 1991.

The tournament had previously appeared on the Tier III of the WTA Tour but no event was held from 1989 to 2003.

Champions

Singles

 Guy Forget defeated  Pete Sampras, 2–6, 7–6(7–4), 6–4
It was Guy Forget's 3rd title of the year and his 6th overall. It was his 1st Masters title.

Doubles

 Ken Flach /  Robert Seguso defeated  Grant Connell /  Glenn Michibata 6–7, 6–4, 7–5

References

External links
 
 Association of Tennis Professionals (ATP) tournament profile

 
Thriftway ATP Championships
Cincinnati Masters
Thriftway ATP Championships
Thriftway ATP Championships
Thriftway ATP Championships